Fleay is a surname of English origin. People with the name include:

 Clarrie Fleay (1886–1955), Australian cricketer
 David Fleay (1907–1993), Australian naturalist
 Frederick Gard Fleay (1831–1909), English Shakespeare scholar

See also
 Flea (disambiguation)
 Fleayi (disambiguation)

Surnames of English origin